The Roman Catholic Diocese of Puqi/Puchi is a diocese located in the city of Puqi (Hubei) in the Ecclesiastical province of Hankou in China.

History
 December 12, 1923: Established as Apostolic Prefecture of Puqi 蒲圻 from the Apostolic Vicariate of Eastern Hupeh 湖北東境
 May 10, 1951: Promoted as Diocese of Puqi 蒲圻

Leadership
 Bishops of Puqi 蒲圻 (Roman rite)
 Bishop Joseph Li Dao-nan (李道南) (May 10, 1951 – 1973)
 Prefects Apostolic of Puqi 蒲圻 (Roman Rite)
 Fr. Joseph Li Dao-nan (李道南) (later Bishop) (February 23, 1949 – May 10, 1951)
 Fr. Joseph Zhang Jing-xiu (張敬修) (April 16, 1929 – 1941)
 Bishop Odorico Cheng He-de, O.F.M. (成和德) (March 21, 1924 – November 13, 1928)

References

 GCatholic.org
 Catholic Hierarchy

Roman Catholic dioceses in China
Christian organizations established in 1923
Roman Catholic dioceses and prelatures established in the 20th century
Religion in Hubei